Magnetawan is a township in the Almaguin Highlands region of the Parry Sound District in the Canadian province of Ontario, as well as the name of the primary population centre in the township.

The Township of Magnetawan was formed in 1998 through the amalgamation of the Township of Chapman and the Village of Magnetawan, along with the unincorporated geographic Townships of Croft and Spence.

The word Magnetawan in the Algonquin language means "swiftly flowing river."

Barbara Hanley, the first woman ever elected mayor of a community in Canada, was born in Magnetawan in 1882.

Magnetawan is the setting for The Rogue Hunter, the tenth book in the popular Urban Fantasy Argeneau series by Ontario-born author Lynsay Sands.

Communities
The township comprises the communities of Ahmic Harbour, Ahmic Lake, Cecebe, Cedar Croft, Chikopi, Dufferin Bridge, Magnetawan, North Seguin, Oranmore, Pearceley, Port Anson and Port Carmen, as well as the ghost town of Spence.

The community is twinned with the city of Baltimore, Maryland.

History
The first people to inhabit the region were the Hurons, Ojibway and Algonquins, who would visit the area in the summer for hunting and fishing but sheltered on Georgian Bay in the winter. While some Europeans explored the region in the early 19th century, settlement and colonization by Europeans was hardly taking place, so much so that the government considered turning the entire region into an Indian reserve.

But when pine stands in southern Ontario became depleted, the area attracted loggers and the government changed its mind and encouraged settlement through free land grants, first offered in 1853. Settlement happened slowly but accelerated when the colonization road from Rosseau to Nipissing began being built in 1866. In 1868, the government passed the Free Grand Land and Homestead Act and began advertising this extensively in European countries to attract new immigrants. Croft Township was surveyed in 1869, Chapman Township in 1870, and the village of Magnetawan was mapped out in 1873.

The Great North Road, from Parry Sound to Nipissing, reached the Magnetawan at Ahmic Harbour, in 1870.

The  stretch of the colony road, from Rousseau to Nipissing reached the Magnetawan in 1874, where the historic village of Magnetawan was built.  In 1879 a pair of small steamships started carrying cargo and passengers over the  reach from the rapids at the village upstream to Burk's Falls.

Burk's Falls was linked to the south by a railroad in 1885.  A lock was completed, enabling navigation west of the rapids at the historic village of Magnetawan, in 1886.  Following its completion larger steamships started carrying cargo and passengers, and towing log booms, over the reach from Burk's Falls to Ahmic Harbour.  During its first 25 years of operation the lock-keeper recorded steamships transited the lock 17,590 times.  The last steamship, a tugboat used to tow log-booms, used the river in 1934.

Geography 
Core rock samples done by Walfried Schwerdtner in the surrounding area, show mostly foliated Grenville Gneiss.

Demographics 

Prior to amalgamation (1998):
 Population total in 1996: 1,324
 Magnetawan (village): 241
 Chapman (township): 645
 Population in 1991:
 Magnetawan (village): 267
 Chapman (township): 605

Mother tongue:
 English as first language: 87.2%
 French as first language: 2.5%
 English and French as first language: 0%
 Other as first language: 10.3%

Local lakes and rivers

 Old Man's Lake
 Ahmic Lake Filled with these species of fish: Smallmouth Bass, Largemouth Bass, Pickerel(Walleye)stocked yearly, Crappie, Sunfish, Rock Bass, Whitefish, Catfish, Perch, and Northern Pike.

 Lake Cecebe
 Magnetawan River
 Beaver Lake
 Horn Lake

Attractions
Magnetawan is a historic village with a surrounding municipality that provides various attractions.  From the museum to the picturesque waters, are all a part of this municipality.  The downtown used to consist of a restaurant named The Magnetawan Inn, also June's Inn, as well as a small hotel/bar, and a General Store.  In the summer of 2011, on July 30, the General Store burned down taking part of the Magnetawan Inn with it.

In the downtown, there is now a brand new general store/restaurant built between 2012 and 2013. Also, there is a museum, Lions Pavilion Park, farmers market, little shops, locks/dams, and a LCBO store. In the village, there is a school, churches, golf course named Ahmic Lake Golf Club, post office, a library, the municipality offices, and the municipality pavilion.  Magnetawan is also home to many resorts and rentable cottages.  Two of the biggest resorts are Woodland Echoes and Ahmic Lake Resort, where the Swiss Country House Restaurant is located.

Following is a list of unique characteristics about this town.

Echo Rock on Lake Cecebe
The shipwreck of the steamboat called the Wenoah in Lake Cecebe
The Trans-Canada Trail
Hand Operated Dam and Locks
Knoepfli and Fagans Falls
The Lighthouse on the Magnetawan River
Echo Beach Cottage Resort
Camp Kahquah 
Golfing
Multipurpose Pavilion
Horseback riding
Fishing and boating in the local lakes
Hunting
Snowmobiling and dog sledding

See also
List of townships in Ontario

References

External links

Designated places in Ontario
Municipalities in Parry Sound District
Single-tier municipalities in Ontario
Magnetawan River